Slasher is a 2004 documentary film directed by John Landis for the Independent Film Channel. The film was produced by Chris Kobin, Stephen Cantor, and Daniel Laikand.

Shot over a weekend in Memphis, Tennessee, the film centers on uber-used car salesman Michael Bennett, a traveling master of the Slasher Sale, Kevin-the-DJ, and Mudd the closer, as they put on a tent-style used car sale.

Reception
The film has met with critical acclaim, it currently holds an 80% score on Rotten Tomatoes.

References

External links
 
 Rotten Tomatoes Reviews

2004 television films
2004 films
Documentary films about businesspeople
2004 documentary films
Films shot in Tennessee
Culture of Memphis, Tennessee
American documentary television films
Films directed by John Landis
Documentary films about automobiles
Films about car dealerships
Used car market
2000s English-language films
2000s American films
Documentary films about Tennessee